Recto station (also known as Recto Terminal station) is an elevated Manila Light Rail Transit (LRT) station situated on Line 2. Located on Recto Avenue at the district boundary of Santa Cruz and Quiapo in Manila, it is the western terminus of the line. Its convenient location has helped create many businesses in the area, from the number of hotels and motels to restaurants and shops, with a good majority of them being a short walk from the station. It is the busiest station in the rail line.

Nearby landmarks
The station is near popular shopping centers like Isetann Cinerama Recto, Odeon Terminal Mall, QQ Mall Quiapo (with a Puregold branch), Raon Shopping Center, Cartimar Manila Shopping Center (not to be confused with the one in Pasay), and Arranque Market. The famous bargain capital of Divisoria and the old grand central terminal of Tutuban are also within a few minutes' commute from the station. Other nearby landmarks include Nice Hotel, the Manila Grand Opera Hotel, Fabella Memorial Hospital, and Manila City Jail (Bilibid Viejo). Due to its position being near the University Belt, the station is also close to educational institutions such as Far Eastern University, Chiang Kai Shek College, Arellano High School, University of the East, Philippine College of Criminology, Philippine College of Health Sciences, STI College Recto, Access Computer College-Manila, and Saint Stephen's High School.

Transportation links
True to its name, Recto station is a major transportation hub. Buses, jeepneys, tricycles, and e-trikes all stop and ply the street level.

Recto station serves as the transfer point for commuters riding the LRT Line 1 via an elevated walkway to Doroteo Jose station.

Gallery

Manila Light Rail Transit System stations
Railway stations opened in 2004
Buildings and structures in Santa Cruz, Manila
Buildings and structures in Quiapo, Manila